Ancylolomia melanella is a moth in the family Crambidae. It was described by George Hampson in 1919. It is found in South Africa, Tanzania and Zimbabwe.

References

Ancylolomia
Moths described in 1919
Moths of Africa